Nathan Massey (born ) is a professional rugby league footballer who plays as a  or  for the Castleford Tigers (Heritage № 876) in the Super League.

He has played at representative level for United States. He has played his entire professional club career with Castleford, from whom he has spent time on loan at the Featherstone Rovers, the York City Knights, the Gateshead Thunder and the Keighley Cougars.

Background
Massey was born in Castleford, West Yorkshire, England.

Playing career

Club career
Massey started his junior career at Wakefield-based Walton Warriors before being signed by Castleford Tigers at the age of 15. He rose through the Academy ranks, and made his first team début in an 88–10 victory over Castleford Lock Lane on 11 March 2007. He was named the Tigers Academy player of the year in 2007, and was given a full-time contract by the club in August 2008.

In March 2010, Massey joined Keighley Cougars on a dual registration deal.

He played in the 2014 Challenge Cup Final defeat by the Leeds Rhinos at Wembley Stadium.

He played in the 2017 Super League Grand Final defeat by the Leeds Rhinos at Old Trafford.

On 17 July 2021, he played for Castleford in their 2021 Challenge Cup Final loss against St. Helens.

International honours
Massey represented the United States making his début as a substitute i.e. number 22 in the 0–70 defeat by Cumbria at Barrow's stadium on 4 November 2007.

Statistics 

(* denotes season still competing)

References

External links
Castleford Tigers profile
SL profile

1989 births
Living people
Castleford Tigers players
English rugby league players
Featherstone Rovers players
Newcastle Thunder players
Keighley Cougars players
Rugby league players from Castleford
Rugby league props
United States national rugby league team players
York City Knights players